Ranunculus inundatus, commonly known as the river buttercup,  is a species of buttercup found in eastern Australia.

References

inundatus
Flora of New South Wales